La Movida Madrileña was a countercultural movement that took place mainly in Madrid during the Spanish transition to democracy after the death of dictator Francisco Franco in 1975. The movement coincided with economic growth in Spain and a widespread desire for the development of a post-Francoist identity. The Concierto homenaje a Canito (Canito Memorial Concert), which took place on February 9, 1980, is traditionally considered the beginning of La Movida Madrileña.

La Movida Madrileña featured a rise in punk rock and synth-pop music, an openness regarding sexual expression and drug usage, and the emergence of new dialects such as cheli. This hedonistic cultural wave started in Madrid before appearing in other Spanish cities such as Barcelona, Bilbao and Vigo.

Origins 
In the years following the death of Francisco Franco, a growing underground punk rock music scene began to form in Madrid. Inspired by the growth of punk rock in the United Kingdom, a number of punk and synthpop bands, such as Tos and Aviador Dro, formed in the late 1970s. However, this new counterculture clashed heavily with the Spanish national government, which mandated an evening curfew for women, criminalized homosexuality, and arrested people with unorthodox appearances for violating a law regarding "dangerousness and social rehabilitation".

La Movida Madrileña gained notoriety following a large punk concert at the Technical University of Madrid on February 9, 1980. Although Francoist elements continued to oppose the increasing liberalization of the city, the government under socialist mayor Enrique Tierno Galván had a more open approach regarding the movement, and subsidized various artistic endeavours. A number of influential foreign artists, such as the Ramones and Andy Warhol, visited Madrid during this time.

Characteristics 
La Movida Madrileña's central component was an aesthetic influenced by punk rock and synth-pop music, as well as visual schools such as dada and futurism. The aesthetic permeated into the city's street fashion, photography, cartoons, and murals, manifesting itself in bright colours, voluminous hair, unconventional and revealing clothing, and heavy makeup use among both genders.

In addition to these artistic representations, La Movida Madrileña also effected an emergent LGBTQ+ community, illicit drug use, and the use of the cheli dialect.

Although some people involved with the movement testified to a lack of a unified political ideology, many elements of the movement were antifascist and had anarchist leanings.

Representatives

The Movida comprised many art movements; Pedro Almodóvar became a well-known example internationally after his success as a film director.

Music
In moods, looks and attitude, the sound resembled the British punk and new wave scenes and the Neue Deutsche Welle, sometimes (in the case of Mecano) mimicking styles such as New Romantic.

Film and television
Almodóvar comically reflected the messiness of the freedom of those years, particularly in his films Pepi, Luci, Bom y otras chicas del montón;  Laberinto de pasiones; and What Have I Done to Deserve this? (1984).

TV programs like La Bola de Cristal and La Edad de Oro contributed to spread the aesthetics of the movement to a wider audience.

Photography and painting
Photographer Gorka de Duo accompanied Warhol and had an exhibition with Robert Mapplethorpe in the Fernando Vijande gallery. Illustrator Ceesepe is considered major figure in the movement.

Graffiti
Artists like Muelle created a unique form of street art, later described as “graffiti autóctono madrileño”.

Literature
Writers Gregorio Morales, Vicente Molina Foix, Luis Antonio de Villena, Javier Barquín, José Tono Martínez, Luis Mateo Díez, José Antonio Gabriel y Galán, José Luis Moreno-Ruiz and Ramón Mayrata were prominent in the “Tertulia de Creadores”, which were a cycle of meetings, lectures, debates and happenings that took place in the Círculo de Bellas Artes in Madrid between 1983 and 1984. Many of them, as Gregorio Morales, José Tono Martínez or Ramón Mayrata, were regular collaborators of the art magazine La luna de Madrid. Other publications, such as Oscar Mariné's magazine  (Madrid Kills Me) contributed to the creation of a common identity.

Another important figure outside the artistic world of the Movida was journalist Francisco Umbral, a writer for the newspaper El País, who wrote about and documented the movement.

See also 
Movida viguesa

References

External links
Photogallery of the photograph Gorka De Duo

Culture in Madrid
History of Madrid
Counterculture